Jalal Abdi (born 26 December 1993) is an Iranian football defender who played for Sepahan in the Persian Gulf Pro League.

References

Iranian footballers
1993 births
Living people
People from Sari, Iran
Tarbiat Yazd players
Foolad Yazd players
Esteghlal Khuzestan players
Sanat Mes Kerman F.C. players
Association football defenders
Sportspeople from Sari, Iran